The Byron was a schooner that sank in Lake Michigan off the coast of Oostburg, Wisconsin, United States. In 2009 the shipwreck site was added to the National Register of Historic Places.

History
The commercial vessel Byron, a small undocumented 36-foot schooner, was built  and sailed under the command of Captain William Burmeister of Manitowoc, Wisconsin.  In 1867 she was run down and sunk by the Canton, another schooner.  At the time of the loss, the Byron was valued at about $1000, and the cargo at $400.

The Byron now lies in 135 feet of water 12 miles southeast of Sheboygan, Wisconsin.  The wreckage was discovered by commercial fisherman Danny Burnette in 1977 when a trawl net brought up an anchor.  Divers soon located the wreck site, much of the Byron'''s cargo and equipment was recovered by recreational divers over the next few years.  Today, no cargo or artifacts remain; the Byron is completely covered with a layer of zebra and quagga mussels and the hull is very fragile.

The Byron is significant as a rare example of its type of commercial vessel, once common to Wisconsin's transportation infrastructure and a vital part of its economy in the time before road and rail networks.  There is no surviving historical record of the construction techniques of lakeshoring schooners, making the Byron site a potential source of additional information on this type of 19th century vessel.

References

External links
 Small Boats on a Big Lake: Underwater Archaeological Investigations of Wisconsin’s Trading Fleet 2007-2009.  Contains additional description and photographs of the Byron'' site.

Sheboygan County, Wisconsin
Shipwrecks of Lake Michigan
Shipwrecks of the Wisconsin coast
Shipwrecks on the National Register of Historic Places in Wisconsin
National Register of Historic Places in Sheboygan County, Wisconsin
Wreck diving sites